The 2002 Esiliiga is the 12th season of the Esiliiga, second-highest Estonian league for association football clubs, since its establishment in 1992.

Final table of Esiliiga season 2002

Promotion playoff

FC Kuressaare beat FC Lootus Kohtla-Järve 2–1 on aggregate. Kuressaare promoted to Meistriliiga, Lootus relegated to Esiliiga.

Relegation playoff

FC M.C. Tallinn beat JK Tammeka Tartu 6–2 on aggregate. M.C. promoted to Esiliiga, Tammeka relegated to Second Division.

Top goalscorers 

25 – Andrei Afanassov (Maardu)
21 – Tarmo Neemelo (Kuressaare)
17 – Tiit Tikenberg (Kuressaare)
16 – Glen Atle Larsen (Valga)
15 – Jarmo Ahjupera (Valga)
13 – Ott Meerits (Kuressaare)
12 – Konstantin Vassiljev (TJK)
11 – Joel Lindpere (Valga)
11 – Aivar Priidel (Maardu)
11 – Kristjan Tiirik (Tammeka)

See also
 2002 Meistriliiga

Esiliiga seasons
2
Estonia
Estonia